Cyathula is a genus of medicinal and ornamental plants in the family Amaranthaceae. They are distributed in Africa, Asia, Oceania and the Americas.

Species include:

Cyathula achyranthoides (Kunth) Moq.
Cyathula albida
Cyathula alternifolia
Cyathula angustifolia
Cyathula biflora
Cyathula braunii
Cyathula capitata Moq.
Cyathula ceylanica
Cyathula cordifolia
Cyathula coriacea
Cyathula crispa
Cyathula cylindrica
Cyathula deserti
Cyathula distorta
Cyathula divulsa
Cyathula echinulata
Cyathula erinacea
Cyathula fernando-poensis
Cyathula geminata
Cyathula geniculata
Cyathula globosa
Cyathula globulifera
Cyathula hereroensis
Cyathula hererpensis
Cyathula humbertiana
Cyathula kilimandscharica
Cyathula lanceolata
Cyathula lancifolia
Cyathula lindaviana
Cyathula madagascaricuais
Cyathula mannii
Cyathula merkeri
Cyathula mollis
Cyathula natalensis
Cyathula obtusifolia
Cyathula officinalis – kuan, radix cyathula
Cyathula orbiculata
Cyathula orthacantha
Cyathula orthacanthoides
Cyathula paniculata
Cyathula pedicellata
Cyathula perricriana
Cyathula pobeguinii
Cyathula polycephala
Cyathula prostrata – Prostrate Pastureweed
Cyathula repens
Cyathula sanguinolenta
Cyathula schimperiana
Cyathula semirosulata
Cyathula sequax
Cyathula spathulata
Cyathula spathulifolia
Cyathula sphaerocephala
Cyathula strigosa
Cyathula tomentosa
Cyathula triuncinata
Cyathula triuncinella
Cyathula uncinulata

External links
 UniProt entry
 GBIF entry
 Aluka search
 NPGS/GRIN search

Amaranthaceae
Amaranthaceae genera